Morten Brørs (born 28 July 1973 in Beitstad) is a Norwegian cross-country skier who competed from 1995 to 2004. He earned two World Cup victories, both in sprint events (1999, 2001). His club was Steinkjer SK.

Cross-country skiing results
All results are sourced from the International Ski Federation (FIS).

World Cup

Season titles
 1 title – (1 sprint)

Season standings

Individual podiums
 2 victories  
 3 podiums

References

External links

1973 births
Living people
Norwegian male cross-country skiers
People from Steinkjer
Sportspeople from Trøndelag